The 2015–16 Division 1 Féminine season was the 42nd since its establishment. Lyon successfully retained the title on 8 May 2016, making it the tenth Division 1 title in a row. The season began on 30 August 2015 and ended on 21 May 2016.

Teams 

There were three promoted teams from the Division 2 Féminine, the second level of women's football in France, replacing the three teams that were relegated from the Division 1 Féminine following the 2014–15 season. A total of 12 teams currently compete in the league with three clubs suffering relegation to the second division, Division 2 Féminine.

Teams promoted to 2015–16 Division 1 Féminine
 La Roche-sur-Yon
 Nîmes Métropole Gard
 VGA Saint-Maur

Teams relegated to 2015–16 Division 2 Féminine
 Arras
 Issy
 Metz

Stadia and locations

League table 

Note: A win in D1 Féminine is worth 4 points, with 2 points for a draw and 1 for a defeat.

Results

Season statistics

Top scorers

Top assists

Hat-tricks

4 Player scored 4 goals

References

External links 
 Standings and Statistics
 Official Youtube channel

Fra
2015
1